212 may refer to:

212 AD, the year
212 BC
212 (number)
212 (album), an album by Neil Zaza
"212" (song), a song by Azealia Banks
212 (missile), a Soviet cruise missile
Area code 212, a North American Numbering Plan area code for most of the borough of Manhattan in New York City
December 2016 Jakarta protests, also known as the 212 Action
212: The Power of Love, an Indonesian film about the protest
212 Mart, a minimarket cooperative inspired from the protest